European route E271 is a Class B road part of the International E-road network. It runs only through Belarus, begins in Minsk and ends in Homieĺ.

Route: Minsk - Asipovičy - Babrujsk - Žlobin - Homieĺ. 

On entire length, E271 follows the route of Belarusian national highway .

External links 
 UN Economic Commission for Europe: Overall Map of E-road Network (2007)

271
Roads in Belarus